Felipe Azevedo dos Santos (born 10 January 1987), known as Felipe Azevedo, is a Brazilian footballer who plays for América Mineiro as an attacking midfielder.

Honours 
Sport Recife
Copa do Nordeste: 2014
Chiangrai United
 Thai FA Cup: 2017

References

External links 

1987 births
Living people
Footballers from São Paulo (state)
Brazilian footballers
Association football forwards
Campeonato Brasileiro Série A players
Campeonato Brasileiro Série B players
América Futebol Clube (SP) players
Esporte Clube XV de Novembro (Piracicaba) players
Ituano FC players
Esporte Clube Juventude players
Paulista Futebol Clube players
Santos FC players
Ceará Sporting Club players
Sport Club do Recife players
Associação Atlética Ponte Preta players
América Futebol Clube (MG) players
K League 1 players
Busan IPark players
FC Petržalka players
Slovak Super Liga players
Brazilian expatriate footballers
Brazilian expatriate sportspeople in South Korea
Brazilian expatriate sportspeople in Slovakia
Expatriate footballers in South Korea
Expatriate footballers in Slovakia
People from Ubatuba